Johnny Mowlem (born 12 February 1969) is a professional British racing driver. Mowlem is considered to be among the world's elite sports car drivers, having competed in every class of world championship sports car racing.

He is the 2013 European Le Mans Series GT champion, having previously won the British Porsche Cup championship in 1996 and 1997. He has class victories in both the 24 Hours of Daytona and the 12 Hours of Sebring, and has earned podiums at virtually all of the world's major sports car races, including the Le Mans 24 hours and the 1000 km Nürburgring. He has also achieved overall podium finishes at the Daytona 24 hours as well as at Petit Le Mans.

Mowlem began his career in single seaters racing up to Formula 3 level and got his big break when he was chosen personally by triple Formula One World Champion Jackie Stewart to join his "staircase of "talent" team in the junior single seater formula, alongside drivers of the calibre of Dario Franchitti, Allan McNish and Gil de Ferran. He switched to sportscars in 1996, winning the Class 1 championship of the British Porsche Cup and then gained international recognition the following year when he won all 17 races of the British Porsche Cup to become British champion. This launched his professional career in World Sportscars. Later in his career he gained further international attention for his work as a driver of the hybrid-powered Ginetta Zytek prototype racer in the ALMS in 2008 and 2009. In 2010, Mowlem was a Lotus Racing factory driver, driving the American Le Mans Series (ALMS) and in the International GT Open Series for sports cars in Europe. His latest driving championship came in the European Le Mans Series in 2013. Mowlem raced in the ALMS series every year that sanctioning body held races. Mowlem also operates his own driving academy, working with both corporate clients and drivers wishing for a career in racing.

Mowlem's career has been followed for over the last decade in his home country through a series of documentary television programs that air on the Television network Sky Sports Television.

Personal life
Mowlem, who was born in London, was raised in Majorca, Spain from the age of one until he was seventeen years old. He attend Leeds University where he achieved a joint Honors BA degree in Spanish and Economics. Along with his wife, Fiona, he has two children; a son named Reece and a daughter, Sereina.

Mowlem has a tremendous fitness ethic. He took part in the London Marathon, completing the distance, as part of a charity fundraiser by the British Racing Drivers Club in 2010. The BRDC effort raised eighty thousand pounds. Mowlem's effort was all the more remarkable as his training was limited by a torn Achilles tendon suffered three months earlier. Mowlem was hurt while playing soccer. He ran the London Marathon again in 2011 lowering his personal best to the 3hr 45m mark.

Mowlem was inducted into the University of Leeds Sporting Hall of Fame in October of 2018.

Early career
Mowlem started his racing career in 1990, at age 19, when he competed in Formula Ford 1600 at Brands Hatch. He raced for Jackie Stewart's Staircase of Talent team in the British Formula Vauxhall Lotus class before moving up to the British Formula 3 championship in 1995, winning four times.

Mowlem then switched to sports cars in 1996, racing in the Porsche Carrera Cup Great Britain in 1996 and 1997, winning the class 1 championship in 1996 and then generating his first major media attention in 1997 by winning all 17 races to become British champion for the second time. He earned the pole position for 14 of the 17 events. Winning this championship by remaining un-defeated throughout an entire season earned him international recognition and the Gregor Grant Award for outstanding achievement in motorsport at the International Autosport Awards.

International career
In the 1998 season, Johnny Mowlem along with co-driver David Murry competed in the GT class in the ALMS finished first in the GT class at Laguna Seca Raceway.

Mowlem also finished second in the GT class in the Rolex 24 at Daytona in 1999. That same year, Mowlem and with co-driver David Murry competed in the GT class in the ALMS finished first in the GT class at Laguna Seca Raceway, setting the fastest GT lap of the race with a new track record. The 2000 season included second place class finishes in the 12 Hours of Sebring and the 24 Hours of Le Mans. By then Mowlem was a full-time competitor in the North American-based ALMS while living in the UK. In 2001, Mowlem continued his ALMS career. He drove with a number of co-drivers in the GT and GT1 class. At Sebring, Mowlem was teamed with Petersen Motorsports but the team withdrew the car following the death of co-driver Bob Wollek following a non-racing incident in the Sebring area. Mowlem posted the fastest lap by a GT1 car during the Le Mans race.

Mowlem partnered with Randy Pobst to finish second in the GT class at Le Mans in 2002. He partnered with international stars Tony Stewart and Jan Lammers to drive a factory Crawford race car in the Daytona Prototype category at Daytona. An engine failure stopped the trio after 15 hours.

Mowlem was part of another team that withdrew from competition at Sebring in 2008. The Corsa Motorsports Ferrari team withdrew due to concerns over the tires the team was using.

Major victories and championships
In 2003 Mowlem continued to compete in the United States, earning a second place in GT and second overall at the Daytona 24 Hours and Sebring 12 Hours, as well as victory at the ALMS round held at Road America.

Mowlem won the GT class and again finished second overall at Daytona in 2004, driving with Robin Liddell, Mike Fitzgerald and Jay and Joe Policastro.

Mowlem finished third in the ALMS GT1 drivers' championship in 2004 and 2005. He also competed in several Rolex Sports Car Series events in the United States during those seasons and, including trips for testing sessions, crossed the Atlantic Ocean about 100 times during those two years.

Mowlem won the 2005 UK Reading Sports Personality of the Year, an honour reserved for the top sports performers in his region. Mowlem showed his adaptability during the 2006 season, racing an Aston Martin DBRS9 for Autosport Design Racing in the SPEED World Challenge GT series as well as competing in the International GT Open series in a Porsche and in two different classes in the ALMS. The latter led to one of the highlights of his career. Racing in the ALMS, Mowlem won the GT2 class at Mosport in a Ferrari, and then drove for the factory Zytek team in the LMP1 class in the last two races of the season. Teamed with former Formula One driver Stefan Johansson and Japanese Haruki Kurosawa, Mowlem finished second overall in the Petit Le Mans at Road Atlanta and nearly won the season finale from pole position, again with Johansson, at the newly renamed Mazda Raceway Laguna Seca.

In 2007 Mowlem continued his strong association with Ferrari, racing a 430 in the GT2 class for the Pirelli factory GPC Ferrari team in the Le Mans Series as well as the International GT Open championship. He also drove for the Risi Competizione Ferrari team as their third driver alongside Mika Salo and Jaime Melo in the longer endurance races. This driver combination brought Ferrari a class victory in the 2007 12 Hours of Sebring, with the closest margin of victory in the history of the championship, two-tenths of a second. That victory margin added to Mowlem's closest finish in Daytona 24 Hours history in 2004, where he finished 6.7 seconds ahead of Mike Rockenfeller after 24 hours of racing. At Le Mans in 2007, Salo/Melo/Mowlem were leading their class by 3 laps when Melo had an accident, spinning on an oil slick seventeen hours in the event.

Mowlem joined Corsa Motorsports for the 2008 ALMS season, racing a Ferrari in the GT2 class. Late in the season, the team started a new venture in conjunction with Zytek. Mowlem's continuing association with the Zytek team resulted in a joint effort to race a hybrid-powered car in the P1 class in ALMS. The Ginetta-Zytek GZ09HS hybrid car debuted in 2009. The car, was powered by a hybrid power plant. It combined an internal combustion engine and an electric motor. The effort made history when Mowlem qualified the car third and finished third in the P1 class in a race at Lime Rock Park. Mowlem did much of the test driving during the extensive development process conducted by Zytek.

In 2010 the hybrid program was put on hold but Mowlem has continued his career in ALMS securing drives in the LMPC at Long Beach and Laguna Seca and at Road America and Mosport in a LMP1 Lola driving for AutoCon. Mowlem put the PR1 Mathiasen Motorsports car on the LMP Challenge class pole with a new track record lap averaging 103.558 mph. This LMPC track record in the American Le Mans Series still stands today.[3]

Mowlem signed with Lotus in 2011 to drive race cars for the famed car maker. He is also the primary test driver for the company's development program. He said, "This is the opportunity of a lifetime. Many of the great drivers in racing history have been associated with Lotus at one time or another. Now I'm one of them."
He won for Lotus the Vallelunga 6 hours Silver Cup for GT4 machinery, setting pole position and fastest lap, and also finished third in the 2011 Dubai 24 hours alongside Greg and Leo Mansell and Stefano D'Aste. He also spearheaded the Le Mans 24 Lotus factory effort alongside Rossiter and Hirschi, starting the race and also bringing the Lotus Evora GTE car home in its first major endurance event in 7th place in the GT class.

For 2012, Mowlem signed to drive selected long distance races racing in the LMP1 premier category for Dyson Racing in the American Le Mans Series. The Dyson agreement was reached with permission from Lotus.

Mowlem won the European Le Mans Series GTE driving championship in 2013. Driving a Ferrari 458 GTE for Britain-based RAM Racing, Mowlem and co-driver Matt Griffin won their class in three races and did not finish worse than second in class all season long.

Mowlem also raced on the US side of the Atlantic in 2013. He joined the Dyson Racing LMP1 effort, driving the Thetford/RACER Lola Mazda at Virginia International Raceway, co-driving with Guy Smith. Mowlem started the race and gave the car to Smith with the lead. Smith also led the race before finishing second overall due to an unfortunate strategy call.

At the end of the 2013 season, Mowlem was awarded the Richard Burns Memorial Trophy during the Reading Sports Personality Awards in England. The Burns Trophy is the highest accolade the Reading event issues each year.

Mowlem raced frequently on two continents in 2014. He raced a Ferrari for RAM Racing in defense of his 2013 European Le Mans GT championship and raced in both the United States-based United Sportscar Championship series and in the European Le Mans Series in the GT2 category.

The globe trotting continued in 2015. Mowlem raced in the United Sportscar Championship/North American Endurance Championship in the United States for BAR1 Motorsports in the Prototype Challenge category, driving an Oreca. Mowlem qualified on the class pole for the Rolex 24 at Daytona and finished second. He qualified on the front row for the Petit Le Mans race at Road Atlanta before finishing third in the race. Mowlem also competed in a 12-hour race at Abu Dhabi in a Ferrari 458 GT3.

Mowlem repeated his pole-grabbing performance at Daytona when he captured the Prototype Challenge class pole position in advance of the 2016 Rolex 24 at Daytona. During a driving rain storm, Mowlem posted the quickest qualifying time overall but race administrators elected to start the field according to category, which put the more powerful Daytona Prototype cars at the front of the field. Mowlem finished third in class in the race. Will also compete in a Ferrari 458 GT3 for the factory-supported FF Corse in the European Le Mans GT3 Cup Championship.

As of February 2016, Mowlem's all-time racing record includes 223 races and 40 wins. He has finished second 44 times and third 41 times. Mowlem has captured 35 poles and posted 35 fastest laps during race action. In European Le Mans Series competition, Mowlem has competed in 73 races, winning eight times, qualifying on the pole seven times and posting the fastest lap in the race seven times. He has qualified in the top three 32 times and finished on the class or overall podium 32 times. 

Mowlem became a well-known name in Britcar, after racing with FF Corse in Ferraris with Welsh driver Bonamy Grimes, in 2016 he claimed pole positions in his class at every venue he attended. In 2017, instead of chosen entries, Grimes and Mowlem entered for the whole of the season, and at the end of the season they finished fourth overall in the endurance category and won the class 2 trophy. In 2018, Mowlem only attended one round of the season with Ivor Dunbar in a 488 GT3, winning both races in his category.

Racing record

Complete 24 Hours of Le Mans results

Johnny Mowlem at 12 Hours of Sebring

Races: 9
Average Finish: 24.111/ Class 5.333
Laps completed: 2,304
Average Laps Completed: 256

Johnny Mowlem at 24 Hours of Daytona

Complete FIA World Endurance Championship results

* Season still in progress.

References

External links
Official website
ALMS Official website

English racing drivers
American Le Mans Series drivers
FIA GT Championship drivers
24 Hours of Le Mans drivers
24 Hours of Daytona drivers
European Le Mans Series drivers
Living people
1969 births
Sportspeople from London
People from Mallorca
Alumni of the University of Leeds
FIA World Endurance Championship drivers
24 Hours of Spa drivers
WeatherTech SportsCar Championship drivers
International GT Open drivers
Britcar drivers
24H Series drivers
Status Grand Prix drivers
HVM Racing drivers
Ecurie Ecosse drivers
Porsche Motorsports drivers
AF Corse drivers
Greaves Motorsport drivers
United Autosports drivers
Jota Sport drivers
Le Mans Cup drivers